George Hayward Thomas Simpson-Hayward (7 June 1875 – 2 October 1936) was an English cricketer who played in five Test matches in 1910 and took six wickets on debut in the first innings. He is notable for being the last serious exponent of underarm or lob bowling to appear regularly in first-class cricket.

Educated at Malvern College and Clare College, Cambridge, he played for Cambridge University (1895–97) and Worcestershire (1899–1914) where he was captain from 1911 to 1912. He played regularly throughout his cricketing career for which he was rewarded, aged 34, by being selected to play for the England national cricket team. He played throughout the five-Test series (1909–1910) in South Africa on matting pitches taking the first of his 23 wickets with his fifth ball. He bowled brisk off-breaks along a low trajectory with a leg-break action.

He was a Cambridge Blue at both cricket and football.

References

External links

1875 births
1936 deaths
People educated at Malvern College
Alumni of Clare College, Cambridge
People from Warwick District
England Test cricketers
English cricketers
Worcestershire cricketers
Worcestershire cricket captains
Cambridge University cricketers
Cricketers who have taken five wickets on Test debut
Gentlemen cricketers
Marylebone Cricket Club cricketers
Gentlemen of England cricketers
H. D. G. Leveson Gower's XI cricketers
Oxford University Authentics cricketers